Henderson is a city in Sibley County, Minnesota, United States. The population in was 886 at the 2010 census.

History 
Henderson was founded in August 1852 by Joseph R. Brown, and was named for his mother's maiden name.

By 1855, Henderson had become a fast-growing city. It harbored more than 60 buildings, including a hotel, a warehouse, a steam sawmill, as well as Brown's house, which functioned as a boarding house, a store and the Brown family residence.

In the following years, Henderson quickly became a major distribution center for the inland settlements surrounding the Minnesota River Valley.  It was the trailhead of the Henderson-Pembina road.

By the mid-1860s, Henderson had two major brickyards, The Mattei and Schwartz Brickyards, which both contributed heavily to the early 1900s brick-style buildings still found in Henderson.

The seat for Sibley County was originally established in Henderson, and an imposing courthouse was erected, being put into service in 1879. But pressure from residents of Gaylord, from as far back as 1887, to gain the county seat precipitated a 1915 countywide vote that resulted in Gaylord gaining the seat; this caused around 200 residents to leave Henderson, a major decline in the city's population. During the 50 years after that population loss, Henderson's economy increasingly centered on agriculture. Its success in transitioning to agriculture brought rise to the present Sauerkraut Days celebration. The former courthouse, now the Henderson Community Building, houses Henderson City offices.

Museums & library 
Henderson has two museums and one public library.

 Sibley County Historical Museum: Operated by the Sibley County Historical Society
 J.R. Brown Minnesota River Center: Operated by the Joseph R. Brown Heritage Society
 Henderson Public Library: Henderson is member of the Traverse des Sioux Library Cooperative.

Area parks & wildlife refuges

Allanson's Park

In 1855, the town founder, J.R. Brown, designated the land for future use as a public park. This land became Allanson's Park, which today has 15+ camping sites for tents, campers and RV's, a picnic shelter and playground.

Bender Park

Bender Park is a city park that has a large multipurpose shelter where Sauerkraut Days is held. It also has a two baseball fields and a concession stand. It is the home field to the Le Sueur-Henderson High School Girls Fast pitch team.

Henderson Hummingbird Garden

The Henderson Hummingbird Garden was established as a part of the Henderson Hummingbird Hurrah and is in Bender Park.

High Island Park

High Island Creek Park is 220 acres with over six miles of trails and camping opportunities.

Rush River Park

Rush River Park is 285 acres with over 12 miles of trails with a picnic shelter and camping areas. It is a popular horseback riding destination.

Ney Nature Center

The Ney Nature Center is 446 acres. It provides year-round outdoor activities and indoor programing.

Minnesota Valley National Wildlife Refuge

The Minnesota Valley National Wildlife Refuge is over 70 miles long, stretching from Bloomington to Henderson. It occupies over 14,000 acres. The Refuge is managed by the U.S. Fish and Wildlife Service. About 50% of Henderson borders the Refuge.

Notable people 

 Joseph R. Brown – Minnesota and Wisconsin territorial legislator & town founder
 Jerry Dempsey – Minnesota state legislator (1993–2006)
 Terry Dempsey – Minnesota state legislator (1978–1992); District Court judge (1992–2002)
 Cora Koester – mayor
 Franklin P. Kroehler - Minnesota state legislator and farmer
 Albert G. Lieske - Minnesota state legislator and farmer
 Donald J. McGuire – Lakeville School District superintendent (1960–1982); McGuire Middle School named in his honor; Director Dakota County Technical College (1982–1989)
 Michael E. McGuire – Minnesota state legislator (1955–1966); Purple Heart recipient
 Michael P. McGuire – five-term mayor of Montgomery; owner, McGuire Landscaping; board of directors, Ney Nature Center
 Ray Oldenburg – urban sociologist
 Matthias M. Simmer – photographer and jeweler (1857–1908); studio camera and work Sibley County Historical Society collection
 Edward T. Young – Minnesota attorney general and state legislator

Schools & School District 
The local school district is Independent School District 2397 and operates three facilities. It is the consolidated district of ISD 734 (Henderson) and ISD 393 (Le Sueur), which consolidated in 1991.

 Park Elementary: Park is in Le Sueur with grades K-3
 Hilltop Elementary: Hilltop is in Henderson and is a 4-5 STEM elementary school
 Le Sueur-Henderson High School: The middle school/high school is in Le Sueur with grades 6-12.

Minnesota New County School: MNCS is a Minnesota Public Charter School with two sites that utilizes project-based learning. MNCS Elementary, also known as the "1900 Building", teaches grades K-5. MNCS High School is on Main Street and teaches grades 6-12.

EdVisions Off-Campus High School, also known as EOC, is a Minnesota public charter school formed in Henderson. It is an online high school that utilizes project-based learning with student enrollment from all over Minnesota.

Politics 
Henderson is in Minnesota's 7th congressional district, represented by Michelle Fischbach. It is in Minnesota Senate district 18, represented by Scott Newman, and Minnesota House district 18B, represented by Glenn Gruenhagen.

Geography 

Minnesota State Highways 19 and 93 are two of the main routes in the community. U.S. Highway 169 passes nearby.

Demographics 

As of 2000 the median income for a household in the city was $43,125, and the median income for a family was $49,091. Males had a median income of $31,736 versus $25,688 for females. The per capita income for the city was $17,544. About 4.7% of families and 6.6% of the population were below the poverty line, including 8.7% of those under age 18 and 9.7% of those age 65 or over.

2010 census 
As of the 2010 United States Census, there were 886 people, 377 households, and 236 families residing in the city. The racial makeup of the city was 97.5% White, 0.2% Asian, 1.4% from other races, and 0.9% from two or more races. Hispanic or Latino of any race were 2.5% of the population.

There were 377 households, of which 29.7% had children under the age of 18 living with them, 50.4% were married couples living together, 7.4% had a female householder with no husband present, 4.8% had a male householder with no wife present, and 37.4% were non-families. 30.5% of all households were made up of individuals, and 15.4% had someone living alone who was 65 years of age or older. The average household size was 2.35 and the average family size was 2.95.

The median age in the city was 39.5 years. 23.4% of residents were under the age of 18; 6.7% were between the ages of 18 and 24; 27.1% were from 25 to 44; 27.1% were from 45 to 64; and 15.6% were 65 years of age or older. The gender makeup of the city was 47.9% male and 52.1% female.

References

External links
 

Cities in Minnesota
Cities in Sibley County, Minnesota
1852 establishments in Minnesota Territory